First Universalist Church of Portageville, also known as The Portageville Chapel, is a historic Universalist church in Portageville, Wyoming County, New York.  It is a Greek Revival style structure with Gothic and Federal elements dating to 1841.  The church features a two-stage square tower above the north gable of the building.

It was listed on the National Register of Historic Places in 2008.

References

External links
Universalist Church of Portageville, New York - History Museums on Waymarking.com
The Portageville Chapel website

Churches on the National Register of Historic Places in New York (state)
Unitarian Universalist churches in New York (state)
Greek Revival church buildings in New York (state)
Churches completed in 1841
19th-century Unitarian Universalist church buildings
Churches in Wyoming County, New York
Universalist Church of America churches
National Register of Historic Places in Wyoming County, New York